Olympia Sports was a sporting goods Retail company. The company was founded in 1975 in Portland, Maine. Before it went under liquidation, Olympia Sports had 152 locations, mostly across New England, New York, and the Mid-Atlantic. It was headquartered in nearby Westbrook, Maine, and had a flagship store in Boston.

Olympia Sports also housed the Olympia Sports Foundation, a non-profit clothing bank, where unused clothing and vendor materials are donated to individuals in need. The foundation was shut down in 2016 as a cost-saving measure.

In October 2019, it was announced that Denver, Colorado-based JackRabbit would purchase 75 of the remaining 152 stores, the other 77 stores to be liquidated.

On May 5th, 2022 Schottenstein Stores acquired some of the locations and began liquidation sales.

On July 22, 2022, it was announced that all of the remaining Olympia Sports stores would be liquidated and closed by the end of September.

On February  17, 2023, it was announced that all of the remaining Olympia Sports intellectual properties were sold to Albert Fouerti at an auction

References

External links

Sporting goods retailers of the United States
Retail companies established in 1975
Retail companies disestablished in 2022
Companies that filed for Chapter 11 bankruptcy in 2022